Dongfeng Renault Automobile Company (DRAC) or Dongfeng Renault was an equally owned Chinese joint venture between car manufacturers Dongfeng Motor Group and Renault aimed to produce and sell Renault-badged vehicles, established in 2013. The joint venture emerged from Sanjiang Renault, a previous partnership between Renault and Sanjiang Space established in 1993. Renault announced it planned to withdraw from the joint venture in April 2020.

History

Sanjiang Renault
In 1993, Renault and Sanjiang Space Group established a manufacturing joint venture at Xiaogan called Sanjiang Renault Automotive Company. Renault had a 45% stake in the company while Sanjiang had 55%. In 1995, the company started assembling Renault Trafics. The partnership proved unsuccessful, and Sanjiang Renault only assembled 4,906 units before it halted production in 2003 or 2004.

Dongfeng Renault
Talks with Dongfeng began in 2004 or 2003 around the same time production halted at the failed Sanjiang-Renault partnership. As part of Dongfeng's agreements with Nissan, the three companies agreed to create eventually a so-called "golden triangle" of three-way collaboration. In June 2013, Dongfeng acquired the 55% stake in Sanjiang Renault from its erstwhile Chinese partner renaming the legal entity Dongfeng Renault Automobile Company. Renault signed on to the creation of an equally owned joint venture on 16 December 2013 after gaining final approval from the Chinese government.

Dongfeng Renault sold only 18,607 cars in 2019 and reported an operating loss of more than 1.5 billion yuan ($212 million). In April 2020, following poor sales, Renault announced that it would concentrate on commercial and electric vehicles for the Chinese market. In August 2020, the Dongfeng Renault venture was officially dissolved and Renault transferred its stake to Dongfeng. The operations were renamed as 
Dongfeng Motor (Wuhan) Co., Ltd.

Operations
Dongfeng Renault was in charge of Renault's China sales. The Dongfeng Renault plant was built at Wuhan and started production in February 2016. It had an estimated output of up to 150,000 vehicles per year. The Renault's Wuhan facilities also included an engine workshop and a research and development centre.Production focused on sport utility vehicles (SUVs).

Produced models
 Renault Koleos (2016–2020)
 Renault Kadjar (2016–2020)
 Renault City K-ZE (2019-2020)
 Renault Captur (2019-2020)

Imported models
 Renault Fluence (2010-2018)
 Renault Latitude (2010-2018)
 Renault Talisman (2012-2017)
 Renault Koleos (2010-2016)
 Renault Captur (2013-2019)
 Renault Megane R.S. (2013-2018)
 Renault Espace (2018-2020)

Gallery

References

Car manufacturers of China
Dongfeng
Dongfeng Motor joint ventures
Vehicle manufacturing companies established in 1993
Vehicle manufacturing companies disestablished in 2020
Chinese companies established in 1993
Chinese companies established in 2013
2020 disestablishments in China
Chinese-foreign joint-venture companies